David Rodney Lewis (October 15, 1954 – July 14, 2020) was an American professional football player who was a linebacker in the National Football League (NFL).

High school career
Prior to that he played at San Diego City College and Abraham Lincoln High School where Marcus Allen, Akili Smith and Terrell Davis have since played.

College career
Lewis played college football at the University of Southern California where he was All-Pac-10 player.

Professional career
Lewis played for the Tampa Bay Buccaneers, Los Angeles Rams and San Diego Chargers.  He played in the 1980 Pro Bowl.

References

External links

1954 births
2020 deaths
American football linebackers
USC Trojans football players
Tampa Bay Buccaneers players
Los Angeles Rams players
San Diego Chargers players
National Conference Pro Bowl players
Players of American football from San Diego